Levinus Munck (died 1623) was the member of the Parliament of England for Great Bedwyn for the parliament of 1601.

References 

Members of Parliament for Great Bedwyn
English MPs 1601
1623 deaths
Year of birth uncertain